The Racket Man is a 1944 American crime film directed by D. Ross Lederman.

Plot
A racketeer gets his draft notice and becomes a soldier. He comes across a criminal organization while in the Army and decides to do something about it.

Cast
 Tom Neal as Matt Benson
 Hugh Beaumont as 'Irish' Duffy
 Jeanne Bates as Phyllis Lake
 Larry Parks as Larry Lake
 Douglas Fowley as Toby Sykes

References

External links
 

1944 films
1944 crime films
American crime films
American black-and-white films
1940s English-language films
Films directed by D. Ross Lederman
Columbia Pictures films
1940s American films